Pleocoma bicolor is a species of rain beetle in the family Pleocomidae. It is found in western North America.

References

Beetles described in 1935
Taxa named by Earle Gorton Linsley
Scarabaeiformia